Enseigne de Vaisseau Henry (F749) is a  in the French Navy.

Development and design 

Designed to navigate overseas, the escort escorts were fully air-conditioned, resulting in appreciated comfort, which was far from being the case for other contemporary naval vessels.

A posting on a Aviso-escort was a boarding sought after by sailors because it was a guarantee of campaigning overseas and visiting the country.

Four other similar units were built at Ateliers et Chantiers de Bretagne (ACB) in Nantes for the Portuguese Navy under the class name João Belo.

All French units were decommissioned in the mid-1990s. Three ships were sold to the Uruguayan Navy.

In 1984, Commandant Rivière underwent a redesign to become an experimentation building. It will retain only a single triple platform of 550mm anti-submarine torpedo tubes and all the rest of the armament was landed, replaced by a single 40mm anti-aircraft gun and two 12.7mm machine guns.

Construction and career 
Enseigne de Vaisseau Henry was laid down in September 1962 at Arsenal de Lorient, Lorient. Launched on 14 December 1963 and commissioned on 1 January 1965.

In 1973, an experimental helicopter platform was installed above the rear deck, to be then dismantled in 1979, to reinstall its old 100 mm gun.

In 1985, two 40 mm Bofors anti-aircraft guns replaced the 30 mm HSS831 guns.

Her ASM mortar (305 mm) and torpedo tubes were landed in 1990.

In 1994, she was decommissioned and served as a breakwater at the port of Brest.

Provisionally anchored in the Landévennec ship cemetery awaiting dismantling, it left the scene on September 12, 2015 for the military port of Brest, where it was prepared for its transfer which took place on February 25, 2016, to the shipyard of Ghent, Belgium, to be deconstructed by the Franco-Belgian group Galloo.

Citations 

Ships built in Lorient
1963 ships
Commandant Rivière-class frigates